Bertie is a nickname, often a diminutive form (hypocorism) of Albert, Bertram, Bertrand, Robert, etc. The nickname may refer to:

 Edward VII of the United Kingdom (1841–1910), called "Bertie" by his family after "Albert", one of his given names
 George VI of the United Kingdom (1895–1952), also called "Bertie" by his family
 Bertie Ahern (born 1951), Taoiseach of Ireland (1997–2008)
 Bertie Auld (born 1938), Scottish football player and manager of the Lisbon Lions
 Bertie Bolton (1893–1964), Indian Army and British Army officer, police officer and cricketer
 Egbert Cadbury (1893–1967), British Royal Navy First World War pilot and businessman
 Bertie Carvel (born 1977), British actor
 Bertie Clarke (1918–1993), West Indian cricketer
 Bertie Coxall (1924–1993), founder of one of the world's first air courier companies
 Bertie Cozic (born 1978), French former footballer
 Bertie Fulton (1906–1979), amateur footballer from Northern Ireland
 Bertie Harragin (1877–1941), West Indian cricketer
 Bertie Higgins (born 1944), American singer-songwriter
 Bertie Higgins (footballer) (born 1945), Scottish footballer
 Bertie Kerr (1896–1973), Irish soccer player
 Bertie King (1912–1981), Jamaican jazz and mento musician
 Bertie Loel (born 1878), Australian rules footballer
 Bertie Marshall (born 1936), pioneer, musician and music instrument maker of the Steel Pan
 Bertie Mee (1918–2001), English football player and manager of Arsenal F.C.
 Bertie Miller (born 1949), former professional footballer
 Bertie Peacock (1928–2004), football player and manager
 Bertie Perkins (1905–1992), English cricketer
 R. M. "Bertie" Smyllie (1893–1954), editor of The Irish Times
 Herbert Sullivan (1868–1928), nephew, heir and biographer of the British composer Arthur Sullivan
 Bertie Troy (1930–2007), Roman Catholic priest and an All-Ireland Hurling Final-winning manager with Cork
 Bertie Wijesinha (1920-2017), Sri Lankan Sinhala cricketer
 Bertie Wright (1871–1960), British actor of the silent era

See also 

 
 

Lists of people by nickname
Hypocorisms